The Kerrang! Awards 2010 were held in London, England, on 29 July 2010, at The Brewery in Romford and were hosted by Slipknot singer Corey Taylor and Anthrax guitarist Scott Ian.

On 23 June 2010, Kerrang! announced the 2010 nominees. The main categories were dominated by Thirty Seconds to Mars and Paramore with four nominations, followed by You Me at Six and Bullet for My Valentine with three apiece. Bullet for My Valentine was the biggest winner of the night, taking home two awards.

Nominations
Winners are in bold text.

Best British Newcomer
Deaf Havana
General Fiasco
Out of Sight
Rise to Remain
Throats

Best International Newcomer
Dommin
Framing Hanley
Halestorm
The Swellers
Trash Talk

Best British Band
Bullet for My Valentine
Enter Shikari
The King Blues
Lostprophets
You Me at Six

Best International Band
Thirty Seconds to Mars
Avenged Sevenfold
Green Day
Metallica
Paramore

Best Live Band
Thirty Seconds to Mars
Bullet for My Valentine
Green Day
Paramore
Skindred

Best Album
Thirty Seconds to Mars — This Is War
Biffy Clyro — Only Revolutions
Bullet for My Valentine — Fever
Paramore — Brand New Eyes
You Me at Six — Hold Me Down

Best Single
Avenged Sevenfold — "Nightmare"
The Blackout — "Save Ourselves (The Warning)"
Four Year Strong — "Wasting Time (Eternal Summer)"
Slipknot — "Snuff"
You Me at Six — "Liquid Confidence"

Best Video
Thirty Seconds to Mars — "Kings and Queens"
Biffy Clyro — "The Captain"
Cancer Bats — "Sabotage"
Lostprophets — "It's Not the End of the World, But I Can See It from Here"
Paramore — "Brick by Boring Brick"

Classic Songwriter
Lostprophets

No Half Measures
Frank Turner

Kerrang! Inspiration
Rammstein

Kerrang! Services to Metal
Paul Gray

Kerrang! Icon
Ronnie James Dio

Kerrang! Hall of Fame
Mötley Crüe

References

External links
Kerrang! Awards official website

2010
2010 music awards
2010 in London
Culture in London
2010 in British music